Fábio Penchel de Siqueira or simply Fábio (born 1 January 1979) is a Brazilian football striker.

Career
Born in Resende, Rio de Janeiro, Fábio has played professional football for several clubs in Brazil. He has had several spells with Volta Redonda Futebol Clube, where he would lead the Campeonato Carioca in goal-scoring with 16 goals during the 2002 season and win the 2005 Taça Guanabara. With 49 goals, he is the second all-time leading scorer for Volta Redonda. At age 27, he had a brief spell abroad with Saudi side Al Hazm.

References

External links

 Player profile 

1979 births
People from Resende
Brazilian footballers
Volta Redonda FC players
Botafogo de Futebol e Regatas players
Associação Portuguesa de Desportos players
Paraná Clube players
Association football forwards
Living people
Sportspeople from Rio de Janeiro (state)